Del Rey City SC is an American amateur soccer club based in Marina del Rey, California playing in the United Premier Soccer League. The club joined the UPSL in August 2014  shortly after completing the 2014 season in the NPSL.

The club began as a single 7-a-side recreational team composed of FoxSoccer.com and FoxSports.com employees, led by current owner Brian Perez and headquartered in Marina del Rey, California. Perez began expanding the club "into a thriving network of local amateur squads" on Los Angeles' Westside giving names to club teams that would be recognizable to Marina del Rey residents: Del Rey City 90 (named for Highway 90, the Marina Freeway), Del Rey City Admiralty (named for Admiralty Way, one of the main streets in Marina del Rey), Del Rey City 1965 (the year the Marina del Rey harbor was dedicated) and Del Rey City Argonauts (named for the local newspaper The Argonaut).

References

External links
Official team site

Soccer clubs in Greater Los Angeles
United Premier Soccer League teams
Marina del Rey, California
National Premier Soccer League teams
Sports in Los Angeles County, California
2009 establishments in California
Association football clubs established in 2009